David Egydy (born 16 February 1983) is a Czech bobsledder. He competed in the 2018 Winter Olympics.

References

1983 births
Living people
Bobsledders at the 2018 Winter Olympics
Czech male bobsledders
Olympic bobsledders of the Czech Republic